Nelonen Media is a Finnish commercial broadcasting company owned by Sanoma Media Finland, which is a part of Sanoma group.

History

Operations

Free-to-air television channels
 Nelonen (and high definition simulcast channel Nelonen HD)
 Jim
 Liv
 Hero

Radio networks
 Radio Suomipop
 Radio Rock
 Radio Aalto
 Helmiradio (semi-nationwide)
 Loop (semi-nationwide)
 HitMix (semi-nationwide)
 Groove FM
 Me Naiset Radio
 Aito Iskelmä
 Kantriradio

Online streaming and on-demand
 : (previously ) Ruutu is an online catch-up and video on demand service of Nelonen Media's TV channels. The service also offers a premium subscription plan named Ruutu+. Previously, it also offered Nelonen Media's radio programmes on demand, before it was spun off into Supla.fi.
 : (previously Supla.fi) Supla is Nelonen Media's streaming service for audio content.

Former operations

Premium television channels 
Nelonen Media's premium television operation was previously named Nelonen Paketti. In March 2017, all of linear premium channels were renamed Ruutu+ after Ruutu.fi's premium plan, before they were shut down on 1 September 2018.
 Ruutu+ Leffat ja Sarjat
 Ruutu+ Lapset
 Ruutu+ Dokkarit
 Ruutu+ Urheilu: a group of sports channels that consisted of two main channels (Ruutu+ Urheilu 1, Ruutu+ Urheilu 2) and six extra channels (Ruutu+ Urheilu 3 to 8)

References

External links
 Sanoma Media Finland, the parent company of Nelonen Media
 

Mass media in Finland
Broadcasting in Finland